The lake freighter MV Saginaw was launched as John J. Boland in 1953, the third vessel to bear that name. John J. Boland was owned and operated by the American Steamship Company and constructed by Manitowoc Shipbuilding Company at Manitowoc, Wisconsin. In 1999, the ship was sold to Lower Lakes Towing and renamed Saginaw. The ship is currently in service.

Description
The ship was designed for the stone trade and is equipped with a  discharge boom that can be swung 120 degrees to port or starboard. The boom is used to unload the vessel's cargo. 

In 1986 a  bow thruster was installed. In 2007, her turbine was replaced by a MaK 6M43C 6-cylinder diesel engine, generating .

Construction and career
John J. Boland, yard number 417 was one of three self-unloading bulk carriers built by Manitowoc Shipbuilding Company at Manitowoc, Wisconsin. The vessel is notable as one of only three self-unloading ships constructed on the Great Lakes in the 1950s. Her namesake John James Boland, was a co-founder of Boland & Cornelius, the precursor to American Steamship Company, the owners and operators of the vessel. The vessel was launched on 9 May 1953 and completed in September of that year, registered in Buffalo, New York. John J. Boland was used mostly to transport stone and ore cargoes around the Great Lakes. On 16 December 1973, the vessel's boom collapsed onto the dock of the Pulliam Bay Power Plant at Green Bay, Wisconsin. Faulty support cables were determined to be the cause, and the vessel's boom was replaced in March 1974.

By the 1980s the ship had become among the oldest operated by American Steamship Company and was idle for eight years until returned to operation on 22 April 1992 when John J. Boland departed Superior, Wisconsin for Marquette, Michigan. The vessel's cabins had been remodeled and the instruments upgraded. In December 1998, John J. Boland was laid up again and the American Steamship Company did not intend to sail the vessel the following year.

In 1999, she was sold to Lower Lakes Towing, and renamed Saginaw. Two earlier vessels have been named Saginaw, after the Saginaw River. The vessel's registration was changed to Nanticoke, Ontario and the ship was taken to Government Dock at Sarnia, Ontario to undergo a refit. Upon return to service in December 1999, Saginaw now carried cargoes of stone, aggregates, coal, wheat, or salt. On 6 December 2002, Saginaws rudder was damaged in a turn in the Welland Canal. The vessel was repaired at Heddle Marine in Hamilton, Ontario. On 4 April 2003 the bulk carrier became stuck in ice outside Marquette and was not freed until three days later by the Canadian Coast Guard icebreaker .

In 2007, the ship underwent a refit that included swapping out her steam turbine for a diesel engine. The vessel returned to service in June 2008. On 31 December 2011, Saginaw suffered a second boom collapse, this time while loading coal at Thunder Bay, Ontario. The vessel was repaired at Thunder Bay before completing her journey to Sault Ste. Marie, Ontario.

References

References cited

External links
 

1953 ships
Great Lakes freighters
Ships built in Manitowoc, Wisconsin